The rosters of all participating teams at the Women's tournament of the 2022 Rugby World Cup Sevens.

Australia

Brazil

Canada

China

Colombia

England

Fiji

France

Ireland

Japan

Madagascar

New Zealand

Poland

South Africa

Spain

United States

References

External links
Official Website

Rugby World Cup Sevens squads
2022 Rugby World Cup Sevens
Women's rugby union squads